Natalie Hallam (born 7 April 1972) is a British actress. She has worked as an actress in film and TV since 2002. Parts include five of the eight of the Harry Potter films.

Life
Natalie Hallam was born in Nottingham, England to Paul Hallam and Glynis Cook. Natalie wished to be an actress from an early age. First of all acquiring a place at the Central School of Speech and Drama in 1991 and giving up the place due to grant problems. She finally attended the London Method School (Now London Method Studio) in 2002.

Parts include New Tricks, Beautiful People, Extras, EastEnders and parts in five of the eight of the Harry Potter films.

Filmography
The Four Feathers as High Class Lady (2002)
The Gathering Storm as 40's Cinema woman (2002)
Wheeling Dealing as Javelin Thrower (2004)
Stage Beauty as Auditioning Actress (2004)
Harry Potter and the Goblet of Fire as Wizard Teacher (2005)
Perfect Parents as Catholic School Nun (2006)
Extras as When the Whistle Blows Floor Manager (TV episodes, 2006–2007)
Harry Potter and the Order of the Phoenix as Wizard Teacher (2007)
Son of Rambow as Mary's Mother Flashback (2007)
The Dark Knight as Ferry Passenger (2008)
Love Soup as Security guard (TV episode, 2008)
The Day of the Triffids as Blind Woman (TV episode, 2009)

References

External links
http://www.imdb.com/name/nm1900568/

Living people
1972 births
Actors from Nottingham
English film actresses
English television actresses
Actresses from Nottinghamshire